Raiza Wilson (born 10 April 1989) is an Indian model and actress who appears in Tamil films. She rose to fame following her appearance in the Tamil reality TV show Bigg Boss. She won the Filmfare Award for Best Female Debut – South for her role as Sindhuja in Pyaar Prema Kaadhal. After her success she continued to act in films such as Dhanusu Raasi Neyargale (2019), Varmaa (2020), FIR (2022), Poikkal Kuthirai (2022) and Coffee With Kadhal (2022).

Career
Wilson completed her schooling at Nazareth Convent Girls High School and then at JSS International School in Ooty, before moving on to college in Bangalore  During her studies, she also worked as the PR, sales and marketing manager of Hint Lounge and Club in Bangalore. After gaining an interest in modelling, Wilson competed for the Miss India South 2011 title in late 2010, and was awarded the HICC Femina Miss South Beautiful Smile award during the competition. Wilson appeared in her first acting role in Tamil film Velaiilla Pattadhari 2 (2017), where she portrayed the personal assistant of Vasundhara Parameshwar, played by Kajol. Her screen time was very limited and therefore her role ended up being uncredited and minor.

In mid-2017, Wilson received widespread media attention in Tamil Nadu after signing on to appear on the Tamil reality TV show, Bigg Boss (Tamil) - Season 1, hosted by Kamal Haasan. She was evicted from the show after 63 days and in the process became the longest-lasting original female contestant. After her exit, Wilson stated that she felt "fortunate to become the part of the show" and "would cherish the memory forever". Wilson has acted in the lead role in Pyaar Prema Kaadhal, in which she pairs with another Bigg Boss contestant, Harish Kalyan.

After Pyaar Prema Kaadhal, Wilson was signed on to play an important role in Varmaa the Tamil remake of the Telugu film Arjun Reddy directed by Bala. However, this film was later redeveloped as Adithya Varma without Bala and Wilson's involvement. After from the success of Pyaar Prema Kaadhal, Yuvan Shankar Raja and Wilson are collaborating again in Yuvan's third production venture with PPK's co-director Mani Chandru and the film is titled as Alice and the first look was revealed on 14 January 2019.

Filmography
All films are in Tamil, unless otherwise noted.

Television

 Bigg Boss Tamil Season 1 as Contestant
 Bigg Boss Tamil Season 2 as Guest appearance
 Genes Season 2 as Contestant

Awards and nominations

References

External links
 

Female models from Tamil Nadu
Living people
Actresses in Tamil cinema
Place of birth missing (living people)
Indian film actresses
21st-century Indian actresses
People from Ooty
Bigg Boss (Tamil TV series) contestants
1989 births